Europe, the westernmost portion of Eurasia, is often divided into regions and subregions based on geographical, cultural or historical factors. Since there is no universal agreement on Europe's regional composition, the placement of individual countries may vary based on criteria being used. For instance, the Balkans is a distinct geographic region within Europe but individual countries may alternatively be grouped into Southern Europe, Southeastern Europe, or less commonly East Central Europe.

Regional affiliation of countries may also evolve over time. Malta was considered an island of North Africa for centuries but is now generally considered part of Southern Europe. The exact placement of the Caucasus has also varied since classical antiquity and is now regarded by many as a distinct region within or partly in Europe. Greenland is geographically part of North America but has been politically and culturally associated with Northern Europe for more than a millennium. As such, several countries are often included as belonging to a Greater Europe, including Armenia, Cyprus, Greenland, as well as the overseas territories and regions of the European Union.

Subregions 
Groupings by compass directions are the hardest to define in Europe, since there are a few calculations of the midpoint of Europe (among other issues), and the pure geographical criteria of "east" and "west" are often confused with the political meaning these words acquired during the Cold War era.

The modern geographical subregions of Europe include:

 Central Europe
 Eastern Europe
 Northern Europe
 North-central Europe
 North-eastern Europe
 North-western Europe
 Southern Europe
 South-central Europe
 South-eastern Europe
 South-western Europe
 Western Europe

Note: There is no universally agreed definition for continental subregions. Depending on the source, some of the subregions, such as Central Europe or South-eastern Europe, can be listed as first-tier subregions. Some transregional countries, such as Romania or the United Kingdom, can be included in multiple subregions.

The modern geopolitical subregions of Europe include:

Two Europes
 Old Europe and New Europe

Three Europes
 Central Europe
 Eastern Europe
 Western Europe

Historical divisions 
Europe can be divided along many differing historical lines, normally corresponding to those parts that were inside or outside a particular cultural phenomenon, empire or political division. The areas varied at different times, and so it is arguable as to which were part of some common historical entity (e.g., were Germany or Britain part of Roman Europe as they were only partly and relatively briefly part of the Empire—or were the countries of the former communist Yugoslavia part of the Eastern Bloc, since it was not in the Warsaw Pact).

 Roman and non-Roman Europe:  those parts that were inside or outside the Roman Empire.
 Greek Europe and Latin Europe:  those parts that fell into the eastern (Byzantine) and Western Roman Empires.
 Monotheistic Christian and polytheistic Pagan  Europe:  those lands that did and did not observe Christianity in the Middle Ages.
 Catholic and Eastern Orthodoxy in Europe:  those parts on either side of the Great Schism.
 After Reformation: countries of Western Christianity (Catholic and Protestant Churches) and Eastern Christianity (Eastern Orthodox Church, Assyrian Church of the East, Oriental Orthodox churches and the Eastern Catholic Churches)
 Protestant and Catholic Europe:  those parts that, in the main, left the Catholic Church during the Reformation contrasted with those that did not.
 Communist Europe (Eastern Bloc), Capitalist Europe (Western Bloc): those parts on either side of the Iron Curtain and third world countries (neutral and non-aligned during the Cold War).

Contemporary

Economic and political 

 European Union (EU)
 Countries that are member states of the political and economic bloc (27 as of 2020):
 Austria, Belgium, Bulgaria, Croatia, Cyprus, Czech Republic, Denmark, Estonia, Finland, France, Germany, Greece, Hungary, Ireland, Italy, Latvia, Lithuania, Luxembourg, Malta, the Netherlands, Poland, Portugal, Romania, Slovakia, Slovenia, Spain, and Sweden.

 EU Med Group
 An alliance of Mediterranean countries within EU:
 Croatia, Cyprus, France, Greece, Italy, Malta, Portugal, Slovenia, and Spain.

 Eurozone
 Countries that have adopted the euro as their currency:
 Andorra, Austria, Belgium, Croatia, Cyprus, Estonia, Finland, France, Germany, Greece, Ireland, Italy, Latvia, Lithuania, Luxembourg, Malta, Monaco, the Netherlands, Portugal, San Marino, Slovakia, Slovenia, Spain, and Vatican City.

 European Free Trade Association (EFTA)
 A free trade organisation that operates in parallel with, and is linked by treaties to, the EU:
 Liechtenstein, Iceland, Norway, and Switzerland.

 Central European Free Trade Agreement (CEFTA)
 A free trade agreement among non-EU members:
 Albania, Bosnia and Herzegovina,  Kosovo (represented by UNMIK), Moldova, Montenegro, North Macedonia, and Serbia.

 Schengen Area
 A borderless zone created by the Schengen Agreements, comprising:
 Austria, Belgium, Croatia, Czech Republic, Denmark, Estonia, Finland, France, Germany, Greece, Hungary, Italy, Latvia, Lithuania, Luxembourg, Malta, the Netherlands, Poland, Portugal, Slovakia, Slovenia, Spain, Sweden; in addition, by separate agreements Norway, Iceland, Liechtenstein, and Switzerland fully apply the provisions of the Schengen acquis.

 European Union Customs Union
 A customs union of all the member states of the European Union (EU) and some neighbouring countries:
 Austria, Belgium, Bulgaria, Croatia, Cyprus, the Czech Republic, Denmark, Estonia, Finland, France, Germany, Greece, Hungary, Ireland, Italy, Latvia, Lithuania, Luxembourg, Malta, Monaco, the Netherlands, Poland, Portugal, Romania, Slovakia, Slovenia, Spain, Sweden. Andorra, San Marino, and Turkey are each in customs union with the EU's customs territory. 

 Eurasian Economic Union (EAEU)
 An economic union of Armenia, Belarus, Kazakhstan, Kyrgyzstan, and Russia. Moldova and Uzbekistan hold observer status.

 Commonwealth of Independent States Free Trade Area
 A free trade agreement among the members of the Commonwealth of Independent States: Armenia, Belarus, Kazakhstan, Kyrgyzstan, Moldova, Russia, and Tajikistan.

 Organization of the Black Sea Economic Cooperation
 A forum of regional economic cooperation:
 Albania, Armenia, Azerbaijan, Bulgaria, Georgia, Greece, Moldova, Romania, Russia, Serbia, Turkey, and Ukraine.

Other political 

 Council of Europe
 An international organisation whose stated aim is to uphold human rights, democracy, and the rule of law in Europe, and to promote European culture.
 It has 46 member states, with approximately 820 million people.

Eastern European Group 
 One of five United Nations regional groups
 Albania, Armenia, Azerbaijan, Belarus, Bosnia and Herzegovina, Bulgaria, Croatia, Czech Republic, Estonia, Georgia, Hungary, Latvia, Lithuania, Moldova, Montenegro, North Macedonia, Poland, Romania, Russia, Serbia, Slovakia, Slovenia, and Ukraine.

 Eastern Partnership and the Euronest Parliamentary Assembly
 A group of former Soviet Eastern European countries cooperating with the EU:
 Armenia, Azerbaijan, Belarus, Georgia, Moldova, and Ukraine.

 European Political Community
 An intergovernmental forum for political and strategic discussions about the future of Europe, with participants from 45 European countries.

 OECD Europe countries
 European countries that are a part of the OECD:
 Austria, Belgium, the Czech Republic, Denmark, Estonia, Finland, France, Germany, Greece, Hungary, Iceland, Ireland, Italy, Latvia, Lithuania, Luxembourg, the Netherlands, Norway, Poland, Portugal, Slovenia, Slovakia, Spain, Sweden, Switzerland, Turkey, and the United Kingdom.

 Central European Initiative
 A forum of regional cooperation including:
 Albania, Austria, Belarus, Bosnia and Herzegovina, Bulgaria, Croatia, the Czech Republic, Hungary, Italy, Moldova, Montenegro, North Macedonia, Poland, Romania, Serbia, Slovakia, Slovenia, and Ukraine.

 Community for Democracy and Rights of Nations
 A group of former Soviet disputed states in Eastern Europe:
 Abkhazia, Artsakh, South Ossetia, and Transnistria.

 Organization for Security and Co-operation in Europe
 The world's largest security-oriented intergovernmental organization, with 57 participating states mostly in the Northern Hemisphere.

 Visegrád Group
 A cultural and political alliance of four Central European states for the purposes of furthering their European integration, as well as for advancing military, economic and energy cooperation with one another:
 Poland, Czech Republic, Slovakia, and Hungary.

 Centrope
 An Interreg IIIA project to establish a multinational region in Central Europe encompassing four European countries: Slovakia, Austria, Hungary, and the Czech Republic.

 Middleeuropean Initiative
 Promotes Central European cooperation.

Geographical

Peninsulas 
 Apennine Peninsula (Italian Peninsula)
 Located in the south of Europe, the Apennine Peninsula contains the states of Italy, San Marino, and Vatican City

 Balkan Peninsula
 The Balkan Peninsula is located in Southeastern Europe and the following countries and territories occupy land within the Balkans either exclusively or partially:
 Albania, Bosnia and Herzegovina, Bulgaria, Croatia (approximately the southern half), Greece, Kosovo, Montenegro, North Macedonia, Romania (the Dobrudja region), Serbia, Slovenia (the coastal section), and Turkey (East Thrace)

 Fennoscandian Peninsula
Located in the north of Europe, including Finland, Norway, Sweden, and part of Russia

 Iberian Peninsula
 Located in Southwestern Europe, this peninsula contains Andorra, Gibraltar, Portugal, Spain, and a small part of France

 Jutland Peninsula
Jutland of Denmark (main part of the country excluding its islands) and the Schleswig-Holstein region of Germany

 Scandinavian Peninsula
Located in the north of Europe, including Norway, Sweden, and part of Finland

Regional 
 Baltic Rim region
 Denmark, Estonia, Finland, Germany, Latvia, Lithuania, Poland, Russia, and Sweden
 The term Baltic states generally applies to Estonia, Latvia, and Lithuania

 British Isles
 The Isle of Man, the Republic of Ireland, and the United Kingdom

 Carpathian states
 Czech Republic, Hungary, Poland, Romania, Serbia, Slovakia, and Ukraine

 Caucasus
 Armenia, Azerbaijan, Georgia, and Russia; also the disputed territories of Abkhazia, Artsakh, and South Ossetia

 Channel Islands
 Guernsey and Jersey

 Low Countries
 Belgium, Luxembourg, the Netherlands, parts of France, and parts of Germany
Benelux:  Belgium, the Netherlands, and Luxembourg

 Nordic countries
 Sweden, Norway, Finland, Denmark, Greenland, and Iceland
Scandinavia: Sweden, Norway, Denmark
Fennoscandia: Finland, Sweden, Norway and Karelia; a geological region defined by the Fennoscandian shield

 Alpine countries
 States that occupy the Alps:
 Austria, Switzerland, Liechtenstein, Slovenia, Germany, France, and Italy

 Danubian countries
 States that lie along the River Danube:
 Austria, Bulgaria, Croatia, Germany, Hungary, Moldova, Romania, Serbia, Slovakia, and Ukraine

 Balkans
 Overlaps with Southeastern Europe:
 Bulgaria, Greece, Albania, Kosovo, North Macedonia, Bosnia and Herzegovina, Montenegro
 Countries occupying land on and off the Balkans are Romania, Serbia, Croatia, Slovenia, and Turkey (East Thrace).

 Dinaric Alps
 Slovenia, Croatia, Bosnia and Herzegovina, Montenegro, Albania
 Serbia, Kosovo and Italy occupy a small portion of the Dinaric Alps.

 Macaronesia
 Chain of Islands in the North Atlantic
 Azores, Canary Islands, Madeira; also including Cape Verde, an independent African nation.

 Mediterranean countries
 Mediterranean nations are European countries on the Mediterranean Basin:
 Portugal, Spain, France, Monaco, Italy, Slovenia, San Marino, Croatia, Bosnia and Herzegovina, Montenegro, Albania, Greece, Turkey, Cyprus, Malta, and the British territory of Gibraltar
Adriatic region: Italy, Slovenia, Croatia, Bosnia and Herzegovina, Montenegro, Albania

 Pannonian countries
 The Panonnian nations are:
 Austria, Croatia, Hungary, Romania, Serbia, Slovakia, Slovenia, and Ukraine

 Black Sea region
 The Black Sea nations (although some sections lie within Asia) are:
 Abkhazia (de facto state), Bulgaria, Georgia, Romania, Russia, Turkey, and Ukraine

 Caspian Sea region
 The world's largest lake which forms a section of the Asian-European border has five countries occupying its shore. Iran and Turkmenistan lie entirely within Asia while the following countries are transcontinental and have sovereignty over the Caspian Sea's European sector:
 Azerbaijan, Kazakhstan, and Russia

Religious groupings 

 Catholicism in Europe
Catholic-majority countries or regions, including Andorra, Austria, Belgium, Croatia, Czech Republic, France, Southern and Western parts of Germany, Gibraltar (United Kingdom), Hungary, Ireland, Italy, parts of Latvia, Liechtenstein, Lithuania, Luxembourg, Malta, Monaco, the Southern Netherlands,  Poland, Portugal, San Marino, Slovakia, Slovenia, and Spain.

 Eastern Orthodoxy in Europe
Orthodox-majority countries, including Armenia, Artsakh (de facto state), Belarus, Northern and Eastern Bosnia and Herzegovina, Bulgaria, Cyprus, Estonia, Georgia, Greece, Moldova, Montenegro, North Macedonia, Romania, Russia, Serbia, and Ukraine.

 Protestantism in Europe
Protestant-majority countries, including Denmark, Finland, North and Eastern Germany, Greenland (Denmark), Iceland, parts of Latvia, the Northern Netherlands, Norway, Sweden, and the United Kingdom.

 Islam in Europe
Muslim-majority countries, including Albania, Azerbaijan, Bosnia and Herzegovina, Kosovo, Northern Cyprus (de facto state), and Turkey.

 Buddhism in Europe
Kalmykia (Russia) is the only region in Europe where Buddhism is the predominant religion.

Linguistic groupings 

Baltic-speaking Europe
Lithuania, Latvia
 Celtic-speaking Europe
 Brittany (France), Cornwall (England), the Isle of Man (United Kingdom), Northern Ireland, the Republic of Ireland, Scotland, and Wales

 Germanic-speaking Europe
 Benelux countries: Belgium (Flanders), Luxembourg, and the Netherlands
 British Isles: the Republic of Ireland and the United Kingdom
 DACH countries: Austria, Germany, and Switzerland (some cantons); plus Liechtenstein
 Nordic countries: Åland (Finland), Denmark, the Faroe Islands (Denmark), Iceland, Norway (including Svalbard), and Sweden

 Romance-speaking Europe (aka Latin Europe)
 Eastern Romance zone: Moldova, Romania
 Western Romance zone: Andorra, Belgium (Wallonia), France, Italy, Monaco, Portugal, San Marino, Spain, Switzerland (some cantons), and Vatican City
 Eastern and Western Romance zones are geographically separated by either of two sovereign states including Austria or Slovenia with Hungary.

 Slavic-speaking Europe – collectively known as the Slavs
 Northern Slavic zone – collectively known as the North Slavs
 Eastern Slavic zone: Belarus, Russia (including Siberia in Asia), and Ukraine – collectively known as the East Slavs
 Western Slavic zone: Czech Republic, Poland, and Slovakia – collectively known as the West Slavs
 Southern Slavic zone: Bosnia and Herzegovina, Bulgaria, Croatia, Montenegro, North Macedonia, Serbia (inclusive of Kosovo), and Slovenia – collectively known as the South Slavs
 Northern Slavic and Southern Slavic zones geographically separated by any of three countries: Austria, Hungary, and Romania; or by the Black Sea.

Other groupings 
 Blue Banana: describing the concentration of the wealth/economic productivity of Europe in a banana-shaped band running from north west England, London, through Benelux, eastern France, western Germany to northern Italy.
 Celtic Europe
 Civil code Europe and common law Europe: those parts that adopted a Napoleonic Code style system and those that retained a Common Law system.

See also 
 Assembly of European Regions
 Enlargement of the European Union
 European integration
 Geography of Europe
 Politics of Europe
 Politics of the European Union
 Potential enlargement of the European Union
 United Nations geoscheme for Europe

Explanatory notes

References

External links 
 

 
Geography of Europe